La Follette–Bulwinkle Act or Venereal Diseases Control and Prevention Act of 1938 sanctioned federal assistance to U.S. states establishing preventive healthcare for venereal diseases. The United States federal statute commissioned the United States Public Health Service for demonstrations, investigations, and studies as related to the control, prevention, and treatment of opportunistic infections. The public law amended the Army Appropriations Act of 1918 appending the judicial context which created the Division of Venereal Diseases within the Bureau of the Public Health Service.

Passage
The bill was introduced into the U.S. Senate by Robert M. La Follette Jr. of Wisconsin and supported in the House by Alfred L. Bulwinkle of North Carolina. The S. 3290 legislation was passed during the 75th United States Congressional session and enacted into law by the 32nd President of the United States Franklin Roosevelt on May 24, 1938.

Sections of the Act
The Title 42 Section 25 codified law was penned as five sections establishing federal rulings for the Public Health Service enforcement to control and eradicate venereal diseases in the United States as determined by the Surgeon General of the United States.

42 U.S.C. § 25a ~ Assistance to U.S. states
42 U.S.C. § 25b ~ Basis and determination of annual allotments
42 U.S.C. § 25c ~ Quarterly allotments
42 U.S.C. § 25d ~ Prescribe the rules and regulations
42 U.S.C. § 25e ~ Provisions not to limit or supersede existing functions

Approval of Wonder Drug
After the discovery of Penicillium at London's St. Mary's Hospital in 1928, the United States Congress appealed for the antibacterial discovery seeking to diminish the peril of bacterial infection among sexually exploratory populaces.

The 79th United States Congress passed the Federal Food, Drug, and Cosmetic Act Penicillin Amendment on July 6, 1945. The United States public law required the U.S. Food and Drug Administration to certify and test penicillin samplings validating the effectiveness, potency, purification, and safety of the antibiotic drugs.

Communicable Diseases & Public Health Service Act
The 1960s sexual revolution movement prompt the United States Congress to draft amendments for the Public Health Service Act authorizing control, prevention, and vaccination assistance for communicable diseases. The United States statutes were enacted into law by the 37th President of the United States Richard Nixon and the 38th President of the United States Gerald Ford.

Communicable Diseases Legislative Policies
 Communicable Disease Control Amendments of 1970
 Communicable Disease Control Amendments of 1972
 Disease Control Amendments of 1976

In popular culture

By 1914, American exploitation films were produced promoting awareness about hygiene and venereal disease.

Damaged Goods (1914)
Is Your Daughter Safe? (1927)
Damaged Lives (1933)
The Road to Ruin (1934)
Sex Madness (1938)
Sex Hygiene (1942)
To the People of the United States (1943)
Mom and Dad (1945)

See also

19th & 20th Century Hygiene and Tropical Medicine Organizations

19th & 20th Century Medicinal Treatments

Opportunistic Infectious Diseases

References

External links
 
  
 
 
 
 
 
 
 

75th United States Congress
United States federal health legislation
1938 in law
1938 in the United States
Venereal disease legislation